Sagamore Beach is a village in Bourne, Massachusetts, fronting Cape Cod Bay and the east end of the Cape Cod Canal. It occupies the northern half of the Sagamore census-designated place. Along with Buzzards Bay and Bournedale, it is one of the three communities in Barnstable County north of the Cape Cod Canal.

Sagamore Beach is primarily a residential area with a small commercial district near the Sagamore Bridge and Massachusetts Route 3A. Sagamore Beach also adjoins Scusset Beach State Reservation.

Recent development in the 2000s included a new post office, fire station, and several subdivisions.

History
In 1620, when the Mayflower arrived in Plymouth just north of Sagamore Beach, there were roughly 30 Native American tribes in southeastern Massachusetts. The Wampanoag people were the principal tribe of this area. A heavily used trail crossed the area, which the indigenous peoples used to reach the eastern reaches of Cape Cod. The trail, later widened by European settlers, became the main artery to Cape Cod. What is now Massachusetts Route 6A roughly follows that trail. The names of many streets and roads in Sagamore Beach reflect the indigenous peoples of the area, including Tecumseh, Siasconset, Sachem, Scusset, Manomet, Indian Trail, Indian Hill and Fox Run. Sagamore and sachem are Native American titles.

Although initially a village, Sandwich was divided to create the town of Bourne in 1884. The dredging for the Cape Cod Canal had already begun and Sagamore Beach became the Village of Bourne. Although the area was settled by Europeans as early as 1637, the population greatly increased in 1905 when the Christian Endeavor Society founded a summer colony here. Victorian homes built on the bluffs in that era are still present on the shoreline. The Sagamore Beach Colony Club, established in 1909, continues as a community resource today.

See also
Sagamore, Massachusetts

References

Bourne, Massachusetts
Populated coastal places in Massachusetts
Villages in Barnstable County, Massachusetts
Villages in Massachusetts